Carlo Maggi (Latinized Carolus Magius, d. c. 1587) was a Venetian citizen ("cittadino originario") and traveller.
During 1568–1573, he visited much of the Near East, then under Ottoman control, including the city of Jerusalem, where he was made a Knight of the Order of the Holy Sepulchre. He was captured by the Turks during the siege of the city of Nicosia in the Cyprus War of 1570-1571, being able to free himself and to get back to Venice only after the Battle of Lepanto in 1572.

He compiled a short travelogue in manuscript form in 1578, known as the  Codex Maggi, now kept in the Bibliothèque nationale de France. The manuscript consists of 18 miniatures by a Flemish or a Venetian master, showing scenes of Maggi's travels. A French commentary on the manuscript was published by Louis César de La Baume Le Blanc in 1761.

References
 Ariane Isler-de Jongh, François Fossier, Le voyage de Charles Magius, 1568-1573, 1992, .
Description historique d'un volume composé des tableaux peints en miniatures qui représentent les Voyages & les Aventures de CHARLES MAGIUS [...], Paris, 1761 (online facsimile at bnf.fr)
 Baldan Ilaria, Codex Magius, in Chypre, entre Byzance et l'Occident IVe - XVIe siècle, catalogue of the exhibition at the Musée du Louvre (28/10/2012 - 28/1/2013), Musée du Louvre éditions, Parigi, 2012, n. 159. .

External links

Italian travel writers
Italian male writers
1580s deaths
16th century in the Ottoman Empire
Year of birth unknown
16th-century Italian writers
16th-century male writers
16th-century travel writers
Medieval Knights of the Holy Sepulchre